Herpetopoma poichilum is a species of sea snail, a marine gastropod mollusc in the family Chilodontidae.

Distribution
This species occurs in the Pacific Ocean off French Polynesia.

References

External links
 To MNHN Type collection
 To World Register of Marine Species

poichilum
Gastropods described in 2012